Sebastian is a city in Indian River County, Florida, United States at the confluence of the St. Sebastian River and the Indian River. It is two miles away from the Atlantic Ocean. It is the largest city in Indian River County and the biggest population center between Palm Bay, Florida and Fort Pierce, Florida. The city’s economy is heavily reliant on tourism. It has numerous resorts in the local area, such as Disney's Vero Beach Resort. It is very close to many natural and scenic areas like the Pelican Island National Wildlife Refuge, Sebastian Inlet State Park, and St. Sebastian River Preserve State Park.

In 2020, the population recorded by the U.S. Census Bureau was 25,054.

Sebastian is a principal city of the Sebastian−Vero Beach Metropolitan Statistical Area, which includes all of Indian River County.

History
In 1715, several Spanish ships loaded with treasure (known as the 1715 Treasure Fleet) encountered a storm off the shores of the Treasure Coast and were lost. It is estimated that only a portion of the sunken treasure has been found. The value placed on the treasure lost from the 1715 fleet has been estimated at more than US$500 million.

The town of Sebastian was a fishing village as early as the 1870s. In the early 1880s David Peter Gibson and Thomas New settled in the area. New filed to start a post office under the name New Haven. However, New got into legal trouble for misuse of his position as postmaster and was removed. Officially, Sebastian was founded in 1882 and named St. Sebastian, after Saint Sebastian. Later, “St.” was removed from the name of the town, but not from the river. Sebastian was incorporated as a city in 1923.

Nearby Pelican Island was declared the first National Wildlife refuge in the United States in 1903.

Geography

Climate

Demographics

At the 2020 census, There were 25,054 people residing in 10,684 households. The racial make-up of the city was 90.8% White, 3.2% African American, 0.20% Native American, 0.40% Asian, and 3.90% from two or more races. Hispanic or Latino of any race were 6.70% of the population.

14.4% of the population were people under the age of 18, and 35.5% were people over the age of 65. The average household size was 2.39.

51.6% of the population were female and 48.4% male. The median household income for the city was $54,986 in 2020, and the per capita income was $32,400. About 10.6% of the population were below the poverty line.

Government
The Government of the City of Sebastian follows a council-manager government model with a five-member city council as the elected governing body and a city manager as the chief operating officer. Members of the city council serve two-year terms with staggered elections.

Public safety

Fire Rescue
Indian River County Fire-Rescue provides fire protection and emergency medical services to the citizens of Sebastian.  There are two fire stations assigned to the city:
Station 8 – Engine 8, Rescue 8, Battalion 1.
Station 9 – Quint 9, Rescue 9.

Police Department
The Sebastian Police Department provides police protection for the city. It operates from the municipal complex, and is staffed by approximately 43 sworn officers.

Education
The School District of Indian River County operates public schools.

There are three elementary schools (Sebastian Elementary,  Pelican Island Elementary and Treasure Coast Elementary, two middle schools (Sebastian River Middle School and Sebastian Charter Junior High) and one high school (Sebastian River High School) in the city.

Located to the west of the city center on County Road 512, the North County Public Library is part of the Indian River County Library System.

Transportation

The GoLine Bus system operates buses out of the North County Transit Hub at 90th Avenue & Sebastian Blvd to various parts of Indian River County.

Notable people

 Bryan Augenstein, pitcher in Major League Baseball in 2009 and 2011; born in Sebastian
 Jim Gary, American sculptor, was born in Sebastian 
 Arlo Guthrie, American folk singer-songwriter
 Paul Kroegel, American conservationist

See also 
 Ais people
 Alvaro Mexia
 Andrew Canova
 Bartram Trail
 Robert A. Hardee
 Sebastian River Area Chamber of Commerce

References

External links
 
 City of Sebastian Florida Portal style website, Government, Business, Library, Recreation and more
 City-Data.com Comprehensive Statistical Data and more about Sebastian
 ePodunk
Sebastian Daily

Populated places established in 1924
Cities in Indian River County, Florida
Populated places on the Intracoastal Waterway in Florida
1924 establishments in Florida
Cities in Brevard County, Florida
Cities in Florida